James Arnold Horowitz (June 10, 1925 – June 19, 2015), better known as James Salter, his pen name and later-adopted legal name, was an American novelist and short-story writer. Originally a career officer and pilot in the United States Air Force, he resigned from the military in 1957 following the successful publication of his first novel, The Hunters.

After a brief career in film writing and film directing, in 1979 Salter published the novel Solo Faces. He won numerous literary awards for his works, including belated recognition of works originally criticized at the time of their publication.

Biography
On June 10, 1925, Salter was born and named James Arnold Horowitz, the son of Mildred Scheff and George Horowitz. His father was a real estate broker and businessman who had graduated from West Point in November 1918 and served in the Corps of Engineers with both Army and Army Reserve. The elder Horowitz attained the rank of colonel and was a recipient of the Legion of Merit.

Horowitz grew up in Manhattan, where he attended P.S.6, and the Horace Mann School – his classmates included Julian Beck. While he intended to study at Stanford University or MIT, he entered West Point on July 15, 1942, at the urging of his father – who had rejoined the Corps of Engineers in July 1941, in anticipation of war breaking out. (With others from his original Class of 1919, George Horowitz was called back to West Point after a month of duty to complete a post-graduate officer's course.) Like his father, Horowitz's time at West Point was shortened due to wartime class sizes being greatly increased and the curriculum drastically shortened. He graduated in 1945 after just three years, ranked 49th in general merit in his class of 852.

He completed flight training during his first class year, with primary flight training at Pine Bluff, Arkansas, and advanced training at Stewart Field, New York. On a cross-country navigation flight in May 1945, his flight became scattered and, low on fuel, he mistook a railroad trestle for a runway, crash-landing his T-6 Texan training craft into a house in Great Barrington, Massachusetts. Possibly as a result, he was assigned to multi-engine training in B-25s until February 1946. He received his first unit assignment with the 6th Troop Carrier Squadron, stationed at Nielson Field, the Philippines; Naha Air Base, Okinawa; and Tachikawa Air Base, Japan. He was promoted to 1st lieutenant in January 1947.

Horowitz was transferred in September 1947 to Hickam AFB, Hawaii, then entered post-graduate studies at Georgetown University in August 1948, receiving his master's degree in January 1950. He was assigned to the headquarters of Tactical Air Command at Langley AFB, Virginia, in March 1950, where he remained until volunteering for assignment in the Korean War. He arrived in Korea in February 1952 after transition training in the F-86 Sabre with the 75th Fighter-Interceptor Squadron at Presque Isle Air Force Base, Maine. He was assigned to the 335th Fighter-Interceptor Squadron, 4th Fighter-Interceptor Wing, a renowned MiG-hunting unit. He flew more than 100 combat missions between February 12 and August 6, 1952, and was credited with a MiG-15 victory on July 4, 1952.

Horowitz subsequently was stationed in Germany and France, promoted to major, and assigned to lead an aerial demonstration team; he became a squadron operations officer, in line to become a squadron commander. Inspired by Under Milk Wood, in his off-duty time he wrote his first novel, The Hunters, publishing it in 1956 under the pen name "James Salter". The film rights to the novel allowed Salter to leave active duty with the US Air Force in 1957 to write full-time. He also legally changed his name to Salter. Having served twelve years in the US Air Force, the last six as a fighter pilot, Salter found the transition to full-time writer difficult.

The 1958 film adaptation, The Hunters starring Robert Mitchum, was honored with acclaim for its powerful performances, moving plot, and realistic portrayal of the Korean War. Although an excellent adaptation by Hollywood standards, it was very different from the original novel, which dealt with the slow self-destruction of a 31-year-old fighter pilot, who had once been thought a "hot shot" but who found only frustration in his first combat experience while others around him achieved glory, some of it perhaps invented.

His 1961 novel The Arm of Flesh drew on his experiences flying with the 36th Fighter-Day Wing at Bitburg Air Base, Germany, between 1954 and 1957. An extensively-revised version of the novel was reissued in 2000 as Cassada. Salter however, later disdained both of his "Air Force" novels as products of youth "not meriting much attention". After several years in the Air Force Reserve, he severed his military connection completely in 1961 by resigning his commission after his unit was called up to active duty for the Berlin Crisis.

He moved back to New York with his family. Salter and his first wife Ann divorced in 1975, having had four children: daughters Allan (1955-1980) and Nina (born 1957), and twin sons Claude and James (born 1962). Starting in 1976 he lived with journalist and playwright Kay Eldredge. They had a son, Theo Salter, born in 1985, and Salter and Eldredge married in Paris in 1998. Eldredge and Salter co-authored a book entitled Life Is Meals: A Food Lover's Book of Days, in 2006.

Writing career
Salter took up film writing, first as a writer of independent documentary films, winning a prize at the Venice Film Festival in collaboration with television writer Lane Slate (Team, Team, Team). He also wrote for Hollywood, although disdainful of it. His last script, commissioned and then rejected by Robert Redford, became his novel, Solo Faces.

A widely acclaimed writer of modern American fiction, Salter was critical of his own work, having said that only his 1967 novel A Sport and a Pastime comes close to living up to his standards. Set in post-war France, A Sport and a Pastime is a piece of erotica involving an American student and a young Frenchwoman, told as flashbacks in the present tense by an unnamed narrator who barely knows the student, also yearns for the woman, and freely admits that most of his narration is fantasy. Many characters in Salter's short stories and novels reflect his passion for European culture and, in particular, for France, which he describes as a "secular holy land".

Salter's prose shows the apparent influence of both Ernest Hemingway and Henry Miller, but in interviews with his biographer, William Dowie, Salter states that he was most influenced by André Gide and Thomas Wolfe. His writing often is described by reviewers as "succinct" or "compressed", with short sentences and sentence fragments, and switching between first and third persons, as well as between the present and past tenses. His dialogue is attributed only when necessary to keep clear who is speaking, otherwise he allows the reader to draw inferences from tone and motivation.

His 1997 memoir Burning the Days uses this prose style to chronicle the impact his experiences at West Point, in the Air Force, and as a celebrity pseudo-expatriate in Europe had on the way he viewed his life-style changes. Although it appears to celebrate numerous episodes of adultery, in fact, Salter is reflecting on what has transpired and the impressions of him it has left, just as does his poignant reminiscence on the death of his daughter. A line from The Hunters expresses these feelings: "They knew nothing of the past and its holiness."

Salter published a collection of short stories, Dusk and Other Stories in 1988. The collection received the PEN/Faulkner Award, and one of its stories ("Twenty Minutes") became the basis for the 1996 film Boys. He was elected to The American Academy of Arts and Letters in 2000. In 2012, PEN/Faulkner Foundation selected him for the 25th PEN/Malamud Award saying that his works show the readers "how to work with fire, flame, the laser, all the forces of life at the service of creating sentences that spark and make stories burn".

His final novel, All That Is, was published to excellent reviews in 2013.

Salter's writings—including correspondence, manuscripts, and heavily revised typescript drafts for all of his published works including short stories and screenplays—are archived at the Harry Ransom Center in Austin, Texas.

In the fall of 2014 Salter became the first Kapnick Writer-in-Residence at the University of Virginia.

He died on June 19, 2015, in Sag Harbor, New York.

Awards and honors
 2014 Awarded the Fitzgerald Award for Achievement in American Literature award which is given annually in Rockville Maryland, the city where Fitzgerald, his wife, and his daughter are buried as part of the F. Scott Fitzgerald Literary Festival. 
2013 Windham–Campbell Literature Prize
2012 PEN/Malamud Award
2010 Rea Award for the Short Story
1989 PEN/Faulkner Award

Reception
His friend and fellow author, the Pulitzer Prize-winner Richard Ford, said, "It is an article of faith among readers of fiction that James Salter writes American sentences better than anybody writing today," in his Introduction to Light Years for Penguin Modern Classics. Michael Dirda of the Washington Post is reported to have said that with a single sentence, he could break one's heart. In an introduction to the final interview he gave before his death, Guernica described Salter as having "a good claim to being the greatest living American novelist".

Writer Vivian Gornick had an altogether different take on his most recent writing. In her review of All That Is for Bookforum, she wrote "Certainly, it is true that most writers have only one story in them.... Then again, it is also true that it is the writer's obligation to make the story tell more the third or fourth time around than it did the first. For this reviewer, Salter's work fails on this score. In his eighties he is telling the story almost exactly as he told it in his forties." She also wrote that he was "so out of touch with the life we are actually living".

Works

Novels
 The Hunters (novel, 1957; revised and reissued, 1997)
 The Arm of Flesh (novel, 1961; republished as Cassada, 2000)
 A Sport and a Pastime (novel, 1967)
 Light Years (novel, 1975)
 Solo Faces (novel, 1979)
 Burning the Days (memoir, 1997)
 Cassada (novel, 2012)
 All That Is (novel, 2013)

Screenplays
 Downhill Racer (screenplay, 1969)
 The Appointment (screenplay, 1969)
 Three (screenplay, 1969; also directed)
 Threshold (screenplay, 1981)

Essays and short stories
 Dusk and Other Stories (short stories, 1988; PEN/Faulkner Award 1989)
 Last Night (short stories, 2005)
 There and Then: The Travel Writing of James Salter (essays, 2005)
 "My Lord You" and "Palm Court" (2006)
 "Odessa, Mon Amour" (2009) in Narrative Magazine
 Collected Stories (2013)
 "As Evening Falls" (2014) in Narrative Magazine
 Don't Save Anything (2017)

Other works
 Still Such (poetry, 1988)
 "Passionate Falsehoods". Personal History. The New Yorker August 4, 1997.
 Gods of Tin (compilation memoir, 2004; selections from The Hunters, Cassada, and Burning the Days)
 Life Is Meals: A Food Lover's Book of Days (with Kay Eldredge, 2006)
 Memorable Days: The Selected Letters of James Salter and Robert Phelps  (2010)
 Introduction to Phantoms on the Bookshelves by Jacques Bonnet, translated by Siân Reynolds (2012)

Posthumous publications
The Art of Fiction (2016), with an Introduction by John Casey.  –  the publisher states that "at age eighty-nine, Salter served as the first Kapnick Writer-in-Residence at the University of Virginia, where he composed and delivered the three lectures presented in this book"
Don't Save Anything (2017). Assembled by his wife, contains a collection on non-fiction writing.

Miscellaneous
James Salter's literature has been featured in the 2014 NSW Higher School Certificate.
He is the subject of the closing section of Katie Roiphe's 2016 book The Violet Hour: Great Writers at the End.

References
General
 "A Final Glory: The Novels of James Salter" reproduced on JSTOR
 New York State Writers Institute bio
 The Paris Review interview, Summer 1993, No. 27

Specific

Further reading

 Paumgarten, Nick, Postscript: James Salter, 1925–2015 The New Yorker, June 21, 2015

External links

 Adam Begley, "A Few Well-Chosen Words", with an extensive biography through 1990
 Obituary in The Guardian
 Obituary in The New York Times 
 Works, from Answers.com
 Short biography and interview at Random House
 
 James Salter Papers and Additional Papers at the Harry Ransom Center
 A conversation with author James Salter Interview w/ Charlie Rose, September 19, 1997.
 James Salter author page and article archive from The New York Review of Books
 
 Sophie Roiphe "The Greatest Novelist You Haven't Read", Slate, March 28, 2013
Things American: Writers Remember James Salter  – twenty-four writers reflect on memorable passages from Salter's writing and how he continues to influence their own craft.

1925 births
2015 deaths
20th-century American male writers
21st-century American male writers
20th-century American novelists
21st-century American novelists
20th-century American short story writers
21st-century American short story writers
American male novelists
Jewish American novelists
American male short story writers
American erotica writers
Members of the American Academy of Arts and Letters
PEN/Faulkner Award for Fiction winners
PEN/Malamud Award winners
United States Air Force officers
United States Air Force personnel of the Korean War
American Korean War pilots
United States Military Academy alumni
Horace Mann School alumni
Iowa Writers' Workshop faculty
People from New Jersey
Writers from Manhattan
Novelists from New York (state)
Novelists from Iowa
United States Air Force reservists
21st-century American Jews